New Providence Airport  was a private use airport located on Paradise Island, the Bahamas. It closed in 1999 and the land incorporated into the island resort.

See also
List of airports in the Bahamas

References

External links 
 Airport record for New Providence Airport at Landings.com

Defunct airports
Airports in the Bahamas